Segré is a former commune in the Maine-et-Loire department in western France. On 15 December 2016, it was merged into the new commune Segré-en-Anjou Bleu. There is a subprefecture of the Maine-et-Loire department in Segré.

Geography
In the town of Segré, the Verzée flows into the Oudon.

Twin towns
  Ferndown, Dorset, United Kingdom

See also
Communes of the Maine-et-Loire department

References

External links

Official website

Former communes of Maine-et-Loire
Subprefectures in France
Anjou